Salegentibacter agarivorans is a Gram-negative, strictly aerobic, heterotrophic and motile bacterium from the genus of Salegentibacter which has been isolated from a sponge Artemisina sp.

References

Flavobacteria
Bacteria described in 2006